Hoia Hoia (Hoyahoya) is a Papuan language of Papua New Guinea. It is close to Minanibai. The two varieties, Ukusi-Koparamio Hoia Hoia ("Hoia Hoia" in Ethnologue 17) and Matakaia Hoia Hoia ("Hoyahoya" in Ethnologue 17), are distinct languages, though significantly closer to each other than to other Inland Gulf languages.

The varieties are spoken in Ukusi-Koparamio and Matakaia villages of Bamu Rural LLG in Western Province, Papua New Guinea, respectively.

Word lists of Hoia Hoia dialects have been collected by Carr (1991).

Phonology

Consonants

Vowels

References

Inland Gulf languages
Languages of Papua New Guinea